Pristimantis susaguae is a species of frog in the family Strabomantidae. It is endemic to Colombia. Its natural habitats are tropical moist montane forests and rivers. It is threatened by habitat loss.

Etymology and habitat 
The species name "susaguae" is taken from the Susaguá River in which hydrographic basin the frog has been found. Susaguá is Chibcha, the language spoken by the Muisca who inhabited the area where the toad has been found; the Reserve Forest of Zipaquirá and Cogua, Colombia.

References 

susaguae
Altiplano Cundiboyacense
Susagua
Endemic fauna of Colombia
Amphibians of Colombia
Frogs of South America
Amphibians described in 2003
Taxonomy articles created by Polbot